Freak*on*ica is the fifth studio album by American rock band Girls Against Boys. It was released in 1998 by record label DGC, and it was produced by British producer Nick Launay.

The album received moderate success in the US, though its stylistic shift garnered a mixed reception from critics. Scott McCloud has described that period as having “an atmosphere of stress. But I remember it coming from me...There were no Geffen people in the studio. All the mistakes that were made were made by us.”

Release 

Freak*On*Ica was released on June 2, 1998 by record label DGC. The album received moderate success in the US. By 2002, Freak*On*Ica had sold  44,000 copies in the United States.

Reception 

The album was released to very mixed reviews. Matt Diehl of Entertainment Weekly called it "GVSB's most mesmerizing collection yet." In his retrospective review, Ned Raggett of AllMusic wrote that Freak*on*ica was "practically a joke, sounding more like a commercial band attempting to cover Girls Against Boys than the group itself." Although the album was initially reviewed positively, Kevin Adickes of Pitchfork later described the album as a "calamity" and a "discotheque disaster" in 2002.

Track listing 

 "Park Avenue" – 3:50
 "Pleasurized" – 3:39
 "Psycho-Future" – 3:32
 "Black Hole" – 4:16
 "Roxy" - 4:19
 "One Firecracker" – 3:47
 "Speedway" – 3:43
 "Exorcisto" – 3:56
 "Vogue Thing" – 3:53
 "Push the Fader" – 4:01
 "Exile" – 4:20
 "Cowboy's Orbit" – 4:04

Charts 
 Album

 Singles

References

External links 

 

Girls Against Boys albums
1998 albums